Krishnapur massacre was a massacre of over 227 Bengali Hindu villagers which took place on 18 September 1971 in Krishnapur and neighbouring villages in the district of Sylhet in East Pakistan. In Krishnapur, the Pakistani  army shot 127 Bengali Hindus to death. In the neighbouring villages more than a 100 Hindus were killed.

Background 
Krishnapur was a remote village in the district of Sylhet located in swamp alongside the Balabhadra river. At present the village falls under the Lakhai Upazila, in the south western extremity Habiganj District. Krishnapur is five kilometres to the south of Lakhai police station. To the south of the village runs the Balabhadra river that separates the districts of Habiganj and Brahmanbaria. Krishnapur and the neighbouring Chandipur were Hindu majority villages.

During the first six months of the Liberation War, the people of Krishnapur had led normal lives. Krishnapur, being a remote area, many Hindus took shelter in the village hoping that it would be attacked by the Pakistani army. Though the Pakistani army had taken control of Habiganj and arrived as far as Lakhai, they hadn't proceeded towards Krishnapur. In August, 1971, the Pakistani army committed several war crimes including massacres of the Hindu population in area constituted by present-day Habiganj District. However, from the month of September, the atrocities of the Pakistani  army subsided a bit. However, on 16 September a group of villagers from Krishnapur that had gone to Lakhai were spotted by some boats from Astagram.

Killings 
On 17 September, the Razakars arrived at the dead of the night in country boats and encircled the entire village. On the early morning of 18 September between 4 AM and 5 AM, a group of Pakistani soldiers arrived at Krishnapur from Astagram camp in Kishoreganj. The Pakistani contingent arrived in two speedboats in two groups. One group of soldiers alighted from the boat and started firing indiscriminately as they entered the village. The other group patrolled around the village the speedboat. At this time, the Razakars too began to fire as they entered the village and started looting. They went from door to door and robbed the villagers of their cash and jewellery at gunpoint. The Pakistani soldiers, incited by the Razakars, set fire to all the houses of the village. Then they rounded up 130 men in front of the Kamalamayee High School. The men were made to stand in a line and burst fired. Pramod Ray, Nabadwip Ray and Haridas Ray survived with bullet wounds after being shot. They were handicapped for the rest of their lives.
In the Chandipur locality, there were only 16 families. In Chandipur, all the residents were made to stand in a line and burst fired. 45 Hindus were killed. Only two persons survived the massacre. In Lalchanpur locality, 40 Hindus were rounded up in the residence of Madhu Namashudra. After robbing all their cash, they were made to stand in a line and burst fired to death. Hindus were similarly shot dead in Gokulnagar.

Investigation 
On 4 March 2010, survivor Haridas Ray filed a lawsuit against Liakat Ali and other Razakars at the Habiganj District Magistrates Court. Liakat Ali is from Morakari village, Lakhai Upazila, Habiganj District and the President of Lakhai Upazila Awami League. Soon after filing the lawsuit, Ray began to receive death threats from the Razakars. On 7 June 2010, he filed a general diary in the police station. On 12 August 2010, the Krishnapur massacre was taken up as the first case of crime against humanity by the International Crimes Tribunal from the Sylhet Division. According to Habiganj District Muktijoddha Unit Commander Mohammad Ali Pathan, a team from the Liberation War Ministry has toured the mass killing site.

References 

1971 in Bangladesh
1971 Bangladesh genocide
Massacres of Bengali Hindus in East Pakistan
Persecution of Hindus
Persecution by Muslims
Habiganj District
Massacres in 1971
Ethnic cleansing in Asia
Massacres committed by Pakistan in East Pakistan
September 1971 events in Asia